Armenia competed at the 2013 World Championships in Athletics in Moscow, Russia, from 10 to 18 August 2013.
A team of 1 athlete was announced to represent the country in the event.

Results

(q – qualified, NM – no mark, SB – season best)

Women

References

Nations at the 2013 World Championships in Athletics
World Championships in Athletics
2013